Lars Mytting (born 1 March 1968) is a Norwegian writer.

Career
Born in Fåvang, Mytting made his literary debut in 2006 with the novel Hestekrefter, where focus partly is on cars. His next novel, Vårofferet from 2010, centers around life as a soldier and military equipment. His non-fiction book Hel ved from 2011 was his breakthrough internationally. He has further issued the historical novels Søsterklokkene (2018) and Hekneveven (2020). 

He was awarded the Norwegian Booksellers' Prize in 2014, and the Dobloug Prize in 2022.

References

1968 births
Living people
People from Ringebu
Norwegian novelists
Norwegian non-fiction writers
Dobloug Prize winners